2011 UEFA Women's U-19 Championship Second Qualifying Round is the second round of qualifications for the Final Tournament of 2011 UEFA Women's Under-19 Championship. The matches will be played in March and April 2011. 24 teams are split into 6 groups of 4 and teams in each group play each other once. 23 of those advanced from the 2011 UEFA Women's U-19 Championship First qualifying round, Germany had a bye to this round due to being the top ranked nation. Italy received byes to the final as host.  The top team in each group and the best second-placed team with the best record against the sides first and third in their group will enter the 2011 UEFA Women's U-19 Championship.

Groups

Group 1

Group 2

Group 3

Group 4

Group 5

Group 6

Ranking of second-placed teams
In the ranking of the second-place finishers, only the results against the sides finishing first and third count.

See also
2011 UEFA Women's U-19 Championship First qualifying round

References

External links
UEFA.com; official website

2
2011 second
2011 in women's association football
2011 in youth sport